Spanglerodessus is a genus of predaceous diving beetles in the family Dytiscidae. There is one described species in Spanglerodessus, S. shorti. They are found in the Neotropics.

References

Further reading

 
 
 

Dytiscidae